The Umanka (Ukrainian: Уманка) is a  river in Cherkasy Oblast, Ukraine. It is a tributary of the Yatran River, which it enters southeast of Uman.

References

Rivers of Ukraine